The following highways are numbered 683:

United States